Londontown Manufacturing Company, Inc., also known as Meadow Mill, is a historic cotton mill complex located at Baltimore, Maryland, United States. It is a three-story, Italianate brick structure that features a square tower structure with a truncated spire-like roof having an open bell cupola.  It was erected in 1877 as one of five mills which comprised the Woodberry Manufacturing Company. It was intended for the manufacture of seine twines.  It was home to London Fog, prior to its move to Eldersburg, Maryland.

Londontown Manufacturing Company, Inc. was listed on the National Register of Historic Places in 1973.

References

External links
, including photo from 1969, at Maryland Historical Trust

Buildings and structures in Baltimore
Historic American Engineering Record in Baltimore
Industrial buildings and structures on the National Register of Historic Places in Baltimore
Industrial buildings completed in 1877
Italianate architecture in Maryland
Woodberry, Baltimore
1877 establishments in Maryland